Florin Curuea (born 18 December 1981) is a Romanian rower. He competed in the men's coxless four event at the 2012 Summer Olympics.

References

External links
 

1981 births
Living people
Romanian male rowers
Olympic rowers of Romania
Rowers at the 2012 Summer Olympics
Sportspeople from Bucharest